The Donald Brittain Award is a Canadian television award, presented by the Academy of Canadian Cinema and Television to honour the year's best television documentary on a social or political topic. Formerly presented as part of the Gemini Awards, since 2013 it has been presented as part of the Canadian Screen Awards. The award may be presented to either a standalone broadcast of a documentary film, or to an individual full-length episode of a news or documentary series; documentary films which originally premiered theatrically, but were not already submitted for consideration in a CSA film category before being broadcast on television, are also considered television films for the purposes of the award.

The award is named in honour of Donald Brittain, a pioneering Canadian documentary filmmaker. On one occasion to date, the award has been won by a documentary film about Brittain and his importance to the history of Canadian documentary film.

Nominees and winners

1990s

2000s

2010s

2020s

See also

 Canadian television awards

References

Canadian documentary film awards
Canadian Screen Award television categories
Gemini Awards